Charles Hancock FRCO (4 January 1852 – 6 February 1927) was an organist and composer based in England.

Life

His early musical education was as a chorister in the choir of St George's Chapel, Windsor. He was awarded his FRCO in 1872 and graduated from Oxford University in 1874.

In Leicester he was the conductor of the Leicester New Musical Society.

He died on 6 February 1927, a few weeks before the church was upgraded to cathedral status.

Appointments

Organist of St. Mary's Church, Datchet, Windsor
Organist of St. Andrew's Church, Uxbridge
Assistant organist of St George's Chapel, Windsor
Organist of St. Martin's Church, Leicester 1875 - 1927

Compositions

He composed works for choir and organ.

References

1852 births
1927 deaths
English organists
British male organists
English composers
Fellows of the Royal College of Organists